Renton Football Club was a football club based in Renton, West Dunbartonshire, Scotland. Formed in 1872, they were a prominent team in the early history of Scottish football, and were one of the teams that featured in the first ever Scottish Cup fixture. They won the competition twice, in 1885 and 1888, and were also runners-up three times. Their 6–1 win against Cambuslang in 1888 is the joint record win in a Scottish Cup final.

The club were one of the founder members of the Scottish Football League in 1890, but were expelled soon after for breaching the regulations against professionalism. They returned to the League in 1891, but struggled financially and resigned in 1897. They continued to play in minor senior leagues before folding in 1922.

Renton were one of the first clubs  to win the Football World Championship when in 1888, as Scottish Cup holders, they challenged and beat the FA Cup holders West Bromwich Albion. The club produced 13 internationalists in 11 years also.

History
Dunbartonshire was a hotbed of the game in the early years of organised football in Scotland, with the county's three leading clubs of the era, Dumbarton, Renton and Vale of Leven all forming in 1872, emerging out of shinty clubs in local factories who were turned to the association game by the influence of Queen's Park F.C.  Renton's side was formed by employees of William Striling & Sons, the dye factory of Alexander Wylie, who provided the club with finance and support.

Although not one of the founder members of the Scottish Football Association in 1873, Renton joined the body in time to enter the inaugural (1873–74) Scottish Cup tournament, and on 18 October 1873 were one of the clubs involved in the first day of competition for the new trophy. Renton faced Kilmarnock on neutral territory at Crosshill, Glasgow, winning 2–0. Although full details of the matches played are difficult to ascertain, it is generally believed that this was the first of the three games played that day to kick off, and therefore the first official competitive football match to take place in Scotland. Renton went on to reach the semi final, losing to eventual winners Queen's Park. The following season they went one step further, reaching the final, but again lost to Queen's Park, by 3–0.

The glory years

During the 1880s Renton were amongst the most powerful clubs in the country. They lifted the Scottish Cup for the first time in 1885, beating local rivals Vale of Leven in the final. The 1886 final once again ended in defeat against Queen's Park, but Renton lifted the trophy for a second time in 1888 with an emphatic 6–1 win over Cambuslang, a winning margin that has never been exceeded in a Scottish Cup final. During this period, Renton also lifted another prestigious trophy of the era, the Glasgow Merchants' Charity Cup, four years in succession. During season 1886–87, Renton competed in the FA Cup. They defeated Accrington 1–0 at home in the first round. Following a 2–2 draw at home in the second round, they beat Blackburn Rovers 2–0 in a replay. Preston ended their FA Cup run in the third round, winning 2–0 at Renton.

Three months after their second Scottish Cup triumph, Renton returned to the scene, the second Hampden Park in Glasgow, to face FA Cup holders West Bromwich Albion in a challenge match billed as being for the "Championship of the United Kingdom and the World". The fixture was really no more than a friendly organised between the clubs, without any direct sanction from the respective national associations. Given there were no league competitions as yet, a meeting between the English and Scottish Cup winners could reasonably lay some claim to deciding the leading club in the UK (albeit without any opportunity for the Welsh or Irish equivalents to compete). When Renton won the World Cup, the footballing world was in its infancy in 1888, almost exclusively played by Scottish and English clubs. It was a World Cup Championship by default – nevertheless Renton’s claim is undisputed. A “Champion of the World” sign was proudly displayed on the pavilion at Tontine Park. The trophy can be found in the Hampden Park museum.

Scottish League

The formation of the Football League proved disastrous for Renton, as, before the 1889–90 season, 9 of their first team players had left for English clubs.  In 1890, Renton were one of the eleven founder members of the Scottish Football League, the meeting which led to the establishment of the new competition having been instigated by Renton club secretary Peter Fairly. The club's first experience of League competition was to be cut short a month into the 1890–91 season, however, when they were  suspended from all football by the SFA for playing a friendly against a team billed as "Edinburgh Saints". This was in reality St Bernard's, who had themselves been suspended following allegations of professionalism, in thin disguise. Renton successfully sued the SFA to have their suspension lifted and subsequently resumed their place in the Scottish League for 1891–92. The St Bernard's case illustrated the growing creep of illegal professionalism in Scottish football, a trend no doubt encouraged by the introduction of regular league competition, and one which was to lead to the decline of small town or village clubs, who could never hope to match the financial muscle of the big city clubs.

At the end of the 1893–94 season — the first following the legalisation of professionalism — Renton were relegated to the League's Division Two, never to return to the top level. They continued to run into trouble with the authorities, failing to turn up for their away fixture against Dundee Wanderers in 1894–95, in favour of playing a more lucrative friendly against Queen's Park. The points were therefore awarded to the Wanderers. The club was more rigorous in their attention to that season's Scottish Cup, however, reaching the final for the fifth (and as it turned out, last) time. Once more pitted against the opposition that had embroiled them in their earlier brush with officialdom — St Bernard's — Renton lost out by a 2–1 scoreline.

Decline

Despite this appearance back in the national spotlight, Renton's time in the Scottish League was drawing to a close. In common with Vale of Leven and Dumbarton, the amateur game had favoured Renton, as the clubs all had backing from factories in the area; players could be de facto professionals by taking a factory wage for playing football - something that was common in England - and gaining an advantage over clubs whose players had full-time jobs.

However, once professionalism was allowed, gate money for the biggest clubs easily outstripped the money available from private company backers.  Financial hardship began to hit deeply for a club only ever capable of drawing a few hundred spectators to home matches; at one point, the club had even considered relocating to Glasgow as a solution to their problems (where their appearance had always drawn thousands). Their league career ended four games into the 1897–98 season when, unable to meet their financial guarantees, they tendered their resignation. This was accepted, with Hamilton Academical taking on Renton's remaining fixtures – less than a decade after Renton's "world championship". The club continued to play in a variety of minor senior leagues – mainly the Western League along with their derby rivals Vale of Leven before finally folding in 1922 (not 1921 as sometimes stated) – entering the 1922–23 Scottish Cup, but failing to turn up for their tie.

Their final hour of fame came in the Scottish Cup of 1906–07 when they put out St Bernard's – then leading Division Two – after two draws, and then stunned Scottish football by putting out Dundee, who were to finish second in Division One that year. They finally went out to Queen's Park in the quarter-finals of the competition.

Colours
The club's initial colours were red and white striped (i.e. hooped) shirts and blue knickerbockers.  By the 1880s the club was playing in navy blue.

Stadium
Almost throughout the club's history, their home ground was Tontine Park. After the club's demise, the ground was built over for housing in 1928, with the former location of the centre circle being commemorated in one of the gardens.

Noted players

Twelve Renton players were chosen to represent Scotland between 1885 and 1896. The club's international players were as follows:

 Alexander Barbour
 Harry Campbell
 Robert Glen
 Andrew Hannah
 James Kelly
 Bob Kelso

 John Lindsay
 Archie McCall
 James McCall
 Neil McCallum
 William McColl
 John Murray

Honours
Scottish Cup:
Winners: 1884–85, 1887–88
Runners-up: 1874–75, 1885–86, 1894–95

Other Honours 

 League

 Scottish Combination
 Runners-up: 1902–03, 1903–04
 Western League
 Runners-up: 1917–18

 County

 Dumbartonshire Cup:
 Winners: 1887, 1896, 1908, 1909, 1914
 Runners-up: 1888, 1895, 1899, 1900, 1905, 1912, 1913, 1920

 Dumbartonshire & District League
 Runners-up: 1902

 Charity

 Glasgow Merchants Charity Cup:
 Winners: 1886, 1887, 1888, 1889
 East End Catholic Charity Cup: 
 Winners: 1887

 Other

 Football World Championship:
 Champions: 1888
 Dumbartonshire 2nd XI Cup:
 Winners: 1886, 1887
 Runners-up: 1888
 Mavisbank Tournament
 Winners: 1887

Footnotes

Sources

References

External links
 Renton Football Club Historical Kits.
Photo of Scottish Cup-winning squad, 1888 (Getty Images)

 
Defunct football clubs in Scotland
Football in West Dunbartonshire
Association football clubs established in 1872
Association football clubs disestablished in 1922
1872 establishments in Scotland
1922 disestablishments in Scotland
History of West Dunbartonshire
Scottish Football League teams
Scottish Football League founder members
Scottish Cup winners